Vampirates: Blood Captain is a 2007 children's novel written by British author Justin Somper.  It is a follow-up to Vampirates: Tide of Terror.

Synopsis
For Connor, these are testing times aboard the Diablo, and he finds himself crossing a line from which there is no return. Grace also faces danger as she travels with Lorcan to Sanctuary, a place of healing presided over by Vampirate guru Mosh Zu.

Characters
 Connor Tempest – Fourteen-year-old orphan, pirate, protagonist, and twin brother of Grace Tempest
 Grace Tempest – fourteen-year-old orphan, protagonist, and twin sister of Connor Tempest
 Lorcan Furey – Grace's rescuer/love, Vampirate, lieutenant of the Nocturne
 Vampirate Captain – Mysterious captain of the Vampirate ship. He wears a mask and no longer drinks blood thanks to the healing of Mosh Zu Kamal.
 Darcy Flotsam – Figurehead of the Vampirate ship by day and vampire by night; Grace's friend.
 Sidorio – Vampire who resisted the authority of the Vampirate Captain, resulting in his banishment.
 Cheng Li – Former deputy of the Diablo and current teacher at the Pirate Academy
 Captain Molucco Wrathe – Captain of the Diablo
 Captain Barbarro Wrathe – Captain of the Typhon; younger brother of Molucco.
 Trofie – Barbarro's wife
 Moonshine Wrathe – Barbarro and Trofie's son; has a dislike for Connor and little respect for anyone else.
 Transom – Head servant on the Typhon
 Matilda "Ma" Kettle – Owner of Ma Kettle's Tavern
 Shanti – Lorcan Furey's human donor
 Bartholomew "Bart" Pearce – Fellow pirate aboard the Diablo and Connor's best friend
 Cutlass Cate – Becomes deputy of the Diablo once Cheng Li leaves; known for swordsmanship and skill.
 Sugar Pie – Waitress at Ma Kettle's Tavern
 Jez Stukeley – Former pirate; returns as a Vampirate lieutenant to Captain Sidorio.
 Commodore Kuo – Headmaster of the Pirate Academy
 Jacoby Blunt – Student at Pirate Academy; becomes good friends with Connor.
 Jasmine Peacock – Student at Pirate Academy, a good friend to Jacoby and Connor
 Mosh Zu Kamal – Founder of Sanctuary
 Olivier – Resident of Sanctuary; Mosh Zu's number two.
 Brenden Gonzalez – One of Connor's shipmates aboard the Diablo
 Dani – An in-between currently residing in Sanctuary
 Johnny – Vampire residing in Sanctuary; becomes Grace's friend while Lorcan is recovering from blindness.
 Jenny – Serving girl at Ma Kettle's Tavern; killed by Jez Stukeley when he was bloodthirsty.

2007 British novels
Novels about pirates
Vampire novels
British young adult novels
Simon & Schuster books